The Pakistan Air Force Strategic Forces Command, known as AFSC , is one of the major commands of the Pakistan Air Force responsible for air force elements of strategic deterrence (Pakistan's nuclear arsenal). The command is headquartered in Islamabad and directly reports to the  Strategic Plans division , Chief of Air Staff, President, and the Prime Minister of Pakistan.

The unified military combat command structure is intended to give the civilian leadership a unified resource for greater understanding of specific threats to Pakistan's national and strategic assets and the means to respond to those threats as quickly as possible.

History

The Combat Commanders School (CCS), was established under Colonel Cecil Chaudhry to train the best fighter pilots in the air force for carrying out the strategic bombing operations. However, the need for a strategic command was felt in depth in the 1980s.

In 1981, Israeli Air Force successfully sabotaged the Iraqi nuclear program after commencing a successful surprise air strike on Iraqi nuclear installations at Osirak, under the codename Operation Opera. The Operation Opera played a psychological role in Pakistan as it was a successful operation commenced by Israeli Air Force. The Air Intelligence picked reports about suspected activities near the Indo-Pakistan border. Therefore, PAF was put on high alert and in 1983, the PAF made first contact with suspected IAF F-16s. The PAF jets intercepted the suspected F-16s and confirmed their Israeli identity. The PAF jets took aggressive measures and their tactics surprised the IAF F-16s. Panicked and surprised, the mission was cancelled and IAF F-16s were pulled off immediately.

After this incident, the Chief of Air Staff General Anwar Shamim decided to form a unified command to protect the nuclear deterrence from outside forces. The 1980s was a decade of modernizing of Air Force and PAF inducted and introduced advanced jets in its weaponry. Since the 1990s, the PAF jets are believed to have practiced "toss-bombing"— a method developed by the United States Air Force to deliver nuclear weapons from fighter jets.

The command was highly active in 1998 when the country, under the leadership of Prime Minister Nawaz Sharif, decided to carry out the nuclear test operations at Chagai Hills. The command flew the nuclear devices from Rawalpindi to Chagai and also carried scientists to the nuclear test sites.
The Air Force Strategic Command is one of the most sensitive Commands of Pakistan Air Force. Director General Air Force Strategic Command is also a member of Development Committee of Nuclear Command Authority and Chairman Joint Chiefs of Staff Committee.

No. 16 Squadron and the No. 26 Squadron, have been reported as likely to be tasked with the delivery of nuclear weapons. They were reportedly stationed at PAF Masroor in early 1998. By late 1999 they had reportedly been re-deployed to Peshawar Air Force Base.

In Dec 2010, Air Vice Marshal Sohail Ahmed, former Base Commander Pakistan Air Force Base, Masroor was made its Commander.

References

Strategic forces of Pakistan
Pakistan Air Force
Military units and formations established in 1985
1985 establishments in Pakistan